Sandro Ingolitsch (born 18 April 1997) is an Austrian professional footballer who plays for Sturm Graz.

Club career
Sandro Ingloitsch started his career with SK Bischofshofen and USK Anif. In 2011 he went to the FC Red Bull Salzburg football academy, where he played in all teams. In 2015 he was captain of the U18 team winning the Austrian Championship. He made his Austrian Football First League debut for FC Liefering on 29 May 2015 in a game against SV Mattersburg.

On 5 August 2020 he signed with Sturm Graz.

References

External links
 

1997 births
People from St. Johann im Pongau District
Living people
Austrian footballers
Austria youth international footballers
Austria under-21 international footballers
FC Liefering players
2. Liga (Austria) players
SKN St. Pölten players
SK Sturm Graz players
Austrian Football Bundesliga players
Association football defenders
Footballers from Salzburg (state)